Bayevo is the name of several rural localities in Russia:
Bayevo, Altai Krai, a selo in Bayevsky Selsoviet of Bayevsky District of Altai Krai
Bayevo, Ardatovsky District, Republic of Mordovia, a selo in Bayevsky Selsoviet of Ardatovsky District of the Republic of Mordovia
Bayevo, Ichalkovsky District, Republic of Mordovia, a selo in Rozhdestvenno-Bayevsky Selsoviet of Ichalkovsky District of the Republic of Mordovia
Bayevo, Tengushevsky District, Republic of Mordovia, a village in Narovatovsky Selsoviet of Tengushevsky District of the Republic of Mordovia
Bayevo, Nizhny Novgorod Oblast, a village in Volzhsky Selsoviet of Sokolsky District of Nizhny Novgorod Oblast
Bayevo, Pskov Oblast, a village in Pskovsky District of Pskov Oblast
Bayevo, Sharapovskoye Rural Settlement, Zapadnodvinsky District, Tver Oblast, a village in Sharapovskoye Rural Settlement of Zapadnodvinsky District of Tver Oblast
Bayevo, Zapadnodvinskoye Rural Settlement, Zapadnodvinsky District, Tver Oblast, a village in Zapadnodvinskoye Rural Settlement of Zapadnodvinsky District of Tver Oblast